Pirgulu State Reserve was established in 1968 on the area of  in 1968 in the Shamakhi District, south-east of the Large Caucasus. The reserve was established to protect mountain forests, various flora, and prevent air pollution. The fauna found in the reserve includes over 60 species, including brown bear, wolf, forest cat, lynx, weasel, wild boar, and roe deer.

References

State reserves of Azerbaijan